Gait is the pattern of limb movement during locomotion.

Gait may also refer to:

Specific gaits 
 Gait (human)
 Canine gait
 Horse gait

People 
 Andrew Gait (born 1978), South African cricketer
 Edward Albert Gait (1863–1950), British Indian administrator
 Gary Gait (born 1967), Canadian lacrosse player, twin brother of Paul
 Paul Gait (born 1967), Canadian lacrosse player, twin brother of Gary

Other uses 
 GAIT (wireless), wireless standard to enable cross-operation of wireless telephone technologies